Lopatcong Overlook is an unincorporated community and census-designated place (CDP) located within Lopatcong Township, in Warren County, New Jersey, United States, that was created as part of the 2010 United States Census. As of the 2010 Census, Lopatcong Overlook's population was 734.

Geography
According to the United States Census Bureau, Lopatcong Overlook had a total area of 0.345 square miles (0.895 km2), all of which was land.

Demographics

Census 2010

References 

Census-designated places in Warren County, New Jersey
Lopatcong Township, New Jersey